Thomas Birch (23 November 17059 January 1766) was an English historian.

Life
He was the son of Joseph Birch, a coffee-mill maker, and was born at Clerkenwell.

He preferred study to business but, as his parents were Quakers, he did not go to the university. Notwithstanding this circumstance, he was ordained deacon in the Church of England in 1730 and priest in 1731. As a strong supporter of the Whigs, he gained the favour of Philip Yorke, afterwards Lord Chancellor and first Earl of Hardwicke, and his subsequent preferments were largely due to this friendship. He held successively a number of benefices in different counties, and finally in London.

He was noted as a keen fisherman during the course of his lifetime, and devised an unusual method of disguising his intentions. Dressed as a tree, he stood by the side of a stream in an outfit designed to make his arms seem like branches and the rod and line a spray of blossom. Any movement, he argued, would be taken by a fish to be the consequences of a mild breeze.

In 1735 he became a member of the Society of Antiquaries, and was elected a fellow of the Royal Society, of which he was secretary from 1752 to 1765. In 1728 he had married Hannah Cox, who died in the following year. Birch was killed on 9 January 1766 by a fall from his horse, and was buried in the church of St Margaret Pattens, London, of which he was then rector. He died, according to his will, "in a full confidence in the Mercy and Goodness of almighty God and with a firm persuasion of a blessed Immortality discoverable by the Light of Nature and confirmed for us Christians by that of Revelation", leaving his books and manuscripts to the British Museum, and a sum of about £500 to increase the salaries of the three assistant librarians.

Writings

Birch was prolific, even if Horace Walpole questioned his "parts, taste and judgment." He corresponded with prominent men of his time. Samuel Johnson wrote: "Tom Birch is as brisk as a bee in conversation; but no sooner does he take a pen in his hand, than it becomes a torpedo to him, and benumbs all his faculties".

Birch often collaborated with the greatly successful London bookseller, Andrew Millar, who helped publish some of Birch's most highly profitable publications. These included The Works of the Honourable Robert Boyle, co-written by Reverend Henry Miles (in 5 volumes folio, 1744), and A Complete Collection of the Historical, Political, and Miscellaneous Works of John Milton (in 2 volumes folio, 1738, followed in 2 volumes quarto, 1753).

Birch wrote most of the English lives in the General Dictionary, Historical and Critical, 10 vols. (London, 1734–1741), assisted in the composition of the Athenian Letters (London, 1741–43), edited the State Papers of John Thurloe (London, 1742) and the State Papers of W. Murdin (London, 1759). He also wrote:

Inquiry into the share which King Charles I had in the transactions of the Earl of Glamorgan for bringing over a body of Irish rebels (published by Millar in London, 1756);
Historical view of Negotiations between the Courts of England, France and Brussels 1592-1617 (London, 1749); 
Life of Archbishop Tillotson (London, 1753);
History of the Royal Society of London (London, 1756–1757); 
Life of Henry, Prince of Wales (London, 1760), and other works.
The heads of illustrious persons of Great Britain, in 108 copper plates, engraved by Mr. Houbraken and Mr. Vertue, with their lives and characters, by Thomas Birch, D.D. Secretary of the Royal Society, London, 1761
Among the papers left at his death were some which were published in 1848 as the Court and Times of James I and the Court and Times of Charles I.

Copies of Franklin letters
Recently discovered by American researcher Alan Houston at the British Library is a file entitled Copies of [Benjamin Franklin's] Letters relating to the March of General Braddock.  Birch was said to have obsessively copied any documents of historical importance he could get his hands on. He was a friend of Franklin, and they were both members of the Royal Society. In his autobiography, Franklin refers to his "Quire Book", which has never been found, but which contained letters and papers concerning his efforts to support the British Government at that pre-revolutionary time. They speak of his 1755 efforts to help British Redcoats led by Braddock in their march to defeat the French at Fort Duquesne (in today's Pittsburgh). Braddock desperately needed transportation for his troops, and Franklin rounded up horses and wagons for him using his persuasive powers as Pennsylvania's leading politician. Incidentally, Braddock and most of his men (who included George Washington) were defeated by the French and their Indian allies.

Works
 
  at Google Books.

Notes

References
 
 A. Kippis, Biographia Britannica (London, 1778–1793)
 
 Horace Walpole, Letters (London, 1891).
 Hume, David, Letter to Andrew Millar, April 12, 1755, accessed through "www.millar-project.ed.ac.uk." University of Edinburgh. 

1705 births
1766 deaths
Deaths by horse-riding accident in England
Fellows of the Royal Society
British historians
Historians of the British Isles
People from Clerkenwell
People associated with the British Museum